The Woman Accused is a 1933 American pre-Code drama film directed by Paul Sloane and starring Nancy Carroll and Cary Grant as a young engaged couple on a sea cruise, with the woman being implicated in the death of her former lover. The supporting cast includes Jack La Rue in a sequence opposite Grant in which the latter violently whips him.

Cast

External links
 
 Poster for The Woman Accused

1933 films
1933 drama films
American drama films
American black-and-white films
Films set on ships
Paramount Pictures films
Films directed by Paul Sloane
1930s English-language films
1930s American films